Yann Clairay (born 2 December 1983 in Laval, Mayenne) is a French racing driver. He has competed in such series as Eurocup Formula Renault 2.0 and the Formula Three Euroseries. Clairay won the GT1 class of the 2009 Le Mans Series along with Patrice Goueslard.

Racing record

24 Hours of Le Mans results

Complete GT1 World Championship results

References

External links
 Official website
 Career statistics from Driver Database

1983 births
Living people
People from Laval, Mayenne
French racing drivers
Formula Renault Eurocup drivers
French Formula Renault 2.0 drivers
Formula 3 Euro Series drivers
24 Hours of Daytona drivers
24 Hours of Le Mans drivers
European Le Mans Series drivers
FIA GT1 World Championship drivers
Blancpain Endurance Series drivers
24 Hours of Spa drivers
Sportspeople from Mayenne

Dutch Formula Renault 2.0 drivers
Signature Team drivers
SG Formula drivers
Extreme Speed Motorsports drivers
GT4 European Series drivers